Gornau is a municipality in the district Erzgebirgskreis, in Saxony, Germany.

Subdivisions
Gornau has three subdivisions:
 Gornau
 Dittmannsdorf
 Witzschdorf

Politics

Municipal Council
The local council of Gornau has 14 seats. Since the local elections of 2014, the CDU eight seats, the Alliance of Free Voters four seats, Left one seat and the SPD one seat, too.

Mayor
 1990–1996: Rolf Hänel (neutral)
 1996–1997: Manfred Zähler (sitting mayor)
 1997–2001: Gerhard Olschewski (neutral)
 2001–2015: Johanna Vogler (CDU)
 since 2015: Nico Wollnitzke (CDU)

Education
 Primary school Gornau

Honorary citizens
 Eckhard Börner (born 1951), politician (CDU), mayor of Witzschdorf, MdL (member of the state assembly)
  (born 1956 in Witzschdorf), former enduro rider and quadruple

References

External links
 Gornau Home Page

Erzgebirgskreis